Muwanga is a Ugandan surname that may refer to
Bulaimu Muwanga Kibirige, Ugandan businessman
Christopher Henry Muwanga Barlow (1929–2006), Ugandan poet
Martin Muwanga (born 1983), Ugandan football striker
Paulo Muwanga (c. 1921–1991), Ugandan politician
Professor Johnnie Wycliffe Frank Muwanga-Zake, ICT Applications, Ugandan academic
[[Dr. Elijah Semwendero Keresipo Muwanga-Zake), Ugandan statistician
Muwanga Charles (c.born 1966), Ugandan Luganda scientific neologist  . See Muwanga Charles on Luganda Wikipedia